is a railway station on the Kagoshima Main Line operated by JR Kyushu in Mizumaki, Fukuoka Prefecture, Japan.

Lines

Layout
The station consists of two opposed side platforms serving two tracks.

Adjacent stations

History
The station was opened by Japanese National Railways (JNR) on 1 October 1961 as an added station on the existing Kagoshima Main Line track. With the privatization of JNR on 1 April 1987, JR Kyushu took over control of the station.

See also 
List of railway stations in Japan

References

External links
Mizumaki Station (JR Kyushu)

Railway stations in Fukuoka Prefecture
Railway stations in Japan opened in 1961